Esera Puleitu (born 15 November 1975) is a New Zealand born former Samoan rugby union player. He played as a fly-half. He was part of the 1995 Rugby World Cup roster, where he played against South Africa and England.

External links

Esera Puleitu at New Zealand Rugby History

1975 births
Living people
Samoan rugby union players
Samoan expatriates in New Zealand
Rugby union fly-halves
Samoa international rugby union players